General elections were held in Mauritius on 30 August 1987. The result was a victory for the Alliance, composed of the Labour Party, the Mauritian Socialist Movement and the Mauritian Social Democrat Party, which won 44 of the 70 seats.

The voting system involved twenty constituencies on Mauritius, which each elected three members. Two seats were elected by residents of Rodrigues, and up to eight seats were filled by the "best losers". Voter turnout was 85%.

Results
All 24 seats won by the Union were taken by the MMM. Of the 40 seats won by the MSM–Labour Party alliance, 31 were won by the MSM (26 constituency, five best loser) and nine by the Labour Party (all constituency seats).

References

Elections in Mauritius
1987 in Mauritius
Mauritius
Election and referendum articles with incomplete results